The 2002 SEC men's basketball tournament took place on March 7–10, 2002 in Atlanta, Georgia at the Georgia Dome. The first, quarterfinal, and semifinal rounds were televised by Jefferson Pilot Sports, and the SEC Championship Game was televised by CBS.

Bracket

References

SEC men's basketball tournament
2001–02 Southeastern Conference men's basketball season
SEC men's basketball tournament
SEC men's basketball tournament
SEC men's basketball tournament
College sports in Georgia (U.S. state)
Basketball in Georgia (U.S. state)